Hizam al Akhdar was one of the 32 districts (shabiyat) of Libya, prior to the 2007 administrative reorganization. The former capital city was Abyar.  The territory of Hizam al Akhdar was transferred to the newly enlarged Marj District.

Former bounds
In the north and west, Hizam al Akhdar had a shoreline on the Mediterranean Sea.  On land, it bordered the following districts:
Benghazi - northwest
Marj - east
Al Wahat - southeast
Ajdabiya - southwest

Notes

Hizam